The National Center of Excellence for Aviation Operators (NEXTOR) is part of a national alliance of research institutes with centers dedicated to the advancement of new ideas, the training of professionals, and the growth of knowledge in the field of aviation operations.

Nextor was established in 1996 by the Federal Aviation Administration (FAA) as a collaboration between academia, government, and private industry. It comprises five university centers of excellence, government partners, and industry partners. It offers conferences and research to advance its mission of education and growth of knowledge in the field.

The NEXTOR administrative offices are located at the center of excellence at University of California, Berkeley, as part of the Institute of Transportation Studies. Other centers of excellence are located at Massachusetts Institute of Technology, University of Maryland, College Park, Virginia Polytechnical Institute and State University (Virginia Tech), and George Mason University.

Each NEXTOR university center has its own director:
Michael Ball, Ph.D., University of Maryland at College Park
Arnold Barnett, Massachusetts Institute of Technology
Mark Hansen, Ph.D., UC Berkeley
Lance Sherry, Ph.D., George Mason University
Antonio Trani, Virginia Tech

See also
Transportation Library, UC Berkeley

References
Mark Hansen, Ph.D., Director, NEXTOR, UC Berkeley
Michael Cassidy, Ph.D., Acting Director, UC Berkeley Institute of Transportation Studies
Steven Campbell, Assistant Director, UC Berkeley Institute of Transportation Studies

Virginia Tech
Aviation organizations based in the United States
Research institutes in California
Education in California
Aviation in California
Transportation in California